List of Estonian punk bands

Estonian punk rock groups